Gentleman & The Far East Band Live is the first live album released by the reggae artist Gentleman and The Far East Band. It was recorded during the Cologne session 2003.

Track listing 
Disc 1 - 50:28
 "Intro" - 1:00
 "Fire Ago Bun Dem (Short Version)" - 1:32
 "See Dem Coming" - 2:16
 "Jah Ina Yuh Life" - 3:49
 "Ina Different Time" (feat. Daddy Rings) - 4:39
 "Love Chant" - 4:33
 "Man A Rise" - 5:23
 "Jah Jah Never Fail" - 5:09
 "Dangerzone" - 3:21
 "Check Dis" (feat. Daddy Rings) - 3:21
 "What She Deserves" - 4:07
 "Children Of Tomorrow" - 3:37
 "Dem Gone" - 7:32

Disc 2 - 44:50
 "Good Days" (feat. Tamika & Mamadee) - 4:37
 "Live It Up" - 4:37
 "Rainy Days" (feat. Martin Jondo & Tamika) - 4:26
 "Call Me On The Telephone" (feat. Daddy Rings) - 3:37
 "Runaway" - 4:26
 "Stranded" (feat. Matthias The Dread) - 3:29
 "Politition Boy" - 2:42
 "Sunshine" (feat. Allstars) - 3:16
 "Fire Ago Bun Dem (Long Version)" - 5:48
 "Leave Us Alone" - 7:44

Gentleman (musician) albums
2003 live albums